Enga Ooru Pattukaran is a 1987 Indian Tamil-language romantic drama film directed by Gangai Amaran. The film stars Ramarajan, Rekha and Nishanthi, with Senthamarai, Vinu Chakravarthy, Senthil, Kovai Sarala and S. S. Chandran playing supporting roles. It was released on 14 April 1987. The film was a huge blockbuster at box office, making it as one of the highest grossing Tamil films of 1987. It gave a breakthrough for Ramarajan and Rekha. After this film, Ramarajan-Gangai Amaran duo were known as one of the successful duos in Tamil cinema then.

Plot 

Shenbagam, the daughter of a wealthy landlord, and Seethan, an orphan milkman, are in love but they do not express their love directly. Seethan has been brought up by Maruthamuthu. When Shenbagam's father decides to get her married to a rich man, she commits suicide. Seethan becomes distraught after his lover's death. Maruthamuthu steps in and arranges his marriage with the woman Kaveri. Seethan marries her but cannot forget Shenbagam.

Cast 

 Ramarajan as Seethan
 Rekha as Kaveri
 Nishanthi as Shenbagam
 Senthamarai as Shenbagam and Vadakku Vinayagam's father
 Vinu Chakravarthy as Maruthamuthu
 Senthil as Vadakku Vinayagam
 Kovai Sarala as Sakku
 S. S. Chandran as Sakku's father
 Pasi Sathya as Sakku's mother
 Vennira Aadai Moorthy as Gopi
 S. N. Parvathy as Shenbagam and Vadakku Vinayagam's mother
 Kallapetti Singaram as Panchayat Leader
 Karuppu Subbiah as Robber
 Usilai Mani as Arivumani
 M. N. Nambiar as Kallampattiyan (guest appearance)
 Jaishankar as Manjampatti, Seethan's father (guest appearance)
 Sangili Murugan as Irulappan (guest appearance)
 Dilip as Irulappan's son (guest appearance)
 Gangai Amaran in a cameo appearance

Soundtrack 
The music was composed by Ilaiyaraaja, with lyrics written by Gangai Amaran. The song "Madurai Marikozhundhu", set in the Carnatic raga Mayamalavagowla, was reused as "Yamaho" in Telugu film Jagadeka Veerudu Athiloka Sundari (1990) and the song "Shenbagame" was reused as "Pavurama" in the Telugu film Aa Okkati Adakku (1992).

Release and reception 
Enga Ooru Pattukaran was released on 14 April 1987, and distributed by Sri Sujatha Pictures. The Indian Express criticised the storyline as "static". The reviewer went on to say, "Ilayaraja's brand of soporific tunes mostly in the lower register blend with the unassuming style of the film". Jayamanmadhan of Kalki appreciated the cinematography, music and direction.

References

External links 
 

1980s Tamil-language films
1987 films
1987 romantic drama films
Films directed by Gangai Amaran
Films scored by Ilaiyaraaja
Indian romantic drama films